The fifth expedition of the Somaliland campaign, which took place in 1920, was the final British expedition against the Dervish forces. Although the majority of the combat took place in January, British troops had begun preparations for the assault as early as November 1919. The British forces included elements of the Royal Air Force and the Somaliland Camel Corps. After three weeks of battle,  Diriye Guure's Dervishes were defeated, bringing an effective end to their 20-year resistance.

Background
The British had previously conducted three expeditions to British Somaliland against the dervishes from 1900 to 1904 with limited or no success. In 1913, the Dervishes had previously defeated British forces at the Battle of Dul Madoba.  Following the end of World War I, the British once again turned their attention to the ongoing violence in British Somaliland.

British plans
In 1919, the unrest in British Somaliland alarmed the British Government enough for Lord Milner, the Colonial Secretary, to consider sending a military expedition to the protectorate. The Chief of the Imperial General Staff, Sir Henry Wilson, advised Milner that at least two divisions would be required and this was likely to cost several million pounds.  Such a cost was seen as being prohibitively expensive in the conditions of post-war austerity.

Lord Milner then turned to the newly formed Royal Air Force, asking the Chief of the Air Staff, Sir Hugh Trenchard, if he could suggest a solution.  Trenchard who at that time was most eager to ensure that the air force remained as a separate service, immediately proposed that the RAF should take responsibility for the whole operation.  Milner argued that some ground troops would be needed and Trenchard replied that the local colonial forces which were already in Somaliland would be sufficient.

A meeting was arranged to discuss the coming campaign.  In attendance were: Winston Churchill who was Secretary of State for War and Air, Leo Amery the Colonial Under-Secretary who deputized for Milner, Sir Henry Wilson and Sir Hugh Trenchard.  Wilson was strongly opposed to a campaign being conducted by the Colonial Office and the Air Ministry which would draw upon the War Office's soldiers.  However, when Amery and Trenchard stated that under no circumstances would they request troops, Wilson withdrew his objection and consented to the RAF taking the lead.

Order of battle

By the January 1920, the following British forces were assembled:
 "Z Force" ('"Z" Unit' in some sources) provided by the RAF in Egypt.  The force consisted of:
 12 Airco DH.9A aircraft.  The aircraft were shipped to Somaliland on the Royal Navy aircraft carrier HMS Ark Royal and were used for bombing. One was converted into an air ambulance.
 A vehicle fleet consisting of ten Ford trucks, two Ford ambulances, six trailers, two motorcycles and two Crossley Motors light trucks.
 36 officers and 183 men, including the Z Force commander, Group Captain Robert Gordon, and his chief of staff, Wing Commander Frederick Bowhill.
 The Somaliland Camel Corps which was permanently based in the field as the local gendarmerie regiment.
 One battalion of the King's African Rifles.

Actions

By 1 January 1920 the Z Force had constructed a temporary aerodrome at Berbera from where they operated.  On 21 January RAF aircraft bombed Jideli.  Many of the dervish forces had never seen an aircraft before and were terrified by the aerial bombardment to the extent that they fled into the hills.  It was also during that first bombardment that Hassan came close to being killed, narrowly avoiding death when an unfortunate camel shielded him from a nearby bomb blast.  After the next five days had passed the Z Force had destroyed three Dervish forts; they then provided air support and communications for the ground forces.  This battle established the tactics of aerial bombardment followed by attacks by ground forces, and of using aircraft to provide support for ground troops during concurrent attacks.  These tactics are among the primary methods of wartime operations to this day.

On 28 January the Camel Corps occupied Jideli and Hassan retreated to his main fort at Taleh.  After combined land and air operations, the British took Taleh on 9 February. Dervish forces suffered great losses and were scattered, his forts were damaged and he escaped with only four of his followers to the Ogaden. Hassan lost some of his greatest generals during the battle, including his right-hand man Haji Sudi and Commander Ibrahim Boghl.

Subsequent events
Although in the following months Hassan did regain some power in Ogaden he was never a force in British Somaliland again.  He died of natural causes in December 1920.

In Great Britain, where Mohammed Abdullah Hassan had long been a source of irritation, news of the swift victory was well received in Parliament and the country.  The cost of the 1920 operation was put at £77,000 and Amery described it as "the cheapest war in history".  Trenchard and the newly established RAF were greatly encouraged by the outcome.

The following year in March 1921 at the Cairo Conference, Winston Churchill, who was by then Colonial Secretary, along with the three service chiefs, decided that all British forces in Iraq would be put under control of the RAF.  The intention was to apply the model of imperial air control which had worked in Somaliland to a much larger region which was similarly troubled.

References

External links and further reading
 Official despatches and other reports covering the military actions:
  King's Birthday Honours 1920, including CMG for the Governor of Somaliland, Geoffrey Francis Archer
  Promotions, decorations and mentions in despatches for actions in Somaliland and elsewhere
  despatch by Group Captain Robert Gordon, covering air operations.
   Promotions, decorations and mentions in despatches for actions in Somaliland
 Chakoten – The Danish Military Historical Society – The Anglo-Somali War 1901–1920 
 
 
 

Conflict Between British Forces and The Dervish State, 1920
Conflicts in 1920
20th-century history of the Royal Air Force
Somaliland dervishes
20th-century military history of the United Kingdom
1920 in British Somaliland
Military expeditions
Expeditions from the United Kingdom
British Somaliland

de:Feldzüge in Somaliland